The Uruguayan Football Association ( — ) is the governing body of football in Uruguay. It was founded in 1900, as The Uruguayan Association Football League, and affiliated to FIFA in 1923. It is a founding member of CONMEBOL and is in charge of the national men's team and the national women's team, as well as the Uruguayan football league system.

Presidents 
Chronological list of A.U.F. presidents

Association staff

Tournaments organized 

 Primera División
Copa Uruguay
 Segunda División
 Campeonato Uruguayo Femenino

Men's football 

The AUF organizes the national football tournament, two professional divisions (First Division and Second Division), and the third category (Amateur Second Division), involving amateur teams from Montevideo metropolitan area. Amateur clubs from the rest of the country are organized by the Interior Football Organization (OFI), federation affiliated to the AUF, but independently.

Women's football 

In Women's football the AUF established the Uruguayan Championship which takes place every year since 1997. In conjunction with the OFI they organized a national tournament called National Tournament of Women's Football which there were only two editions (2001 and 2003).

Futsal 
AUF annually develops the Men's Campeonato de Primera Division, U-20, U-17 and the same tournaments for women. The AUF is one of the two entities that regulates futsal, the other is the Uruguayan Federation of Indoor Football.

See also
 Uruguayan Football Federation

References

External links 

 
 Uruguay at FIFA site
 Uruguayan Players Overseas

 
Uruguay
Football in Uruguay
Foo
Sports organizations established in 1900
1900 establishments in Uruguay